John Liddell may refer to:

Sir John Liddell (Royal Navy officer) (died 1868), Scottish doctor and Director-General of the Medical Department of the British Royal Navy
John Liddell (1879–1928), British boxer better known as Jack Palmer
John Liddell (footballer) (1933–1999), Scottish footballer
John Aidan Liddell (1888–1915), English pilot and recipient of the Victoria Cross
John Hellyer Liddell, (1899–1984), Chairman of the Shanghai Municipal Council
St. John Richardson Liddell (1815–1870), Louisiana planter and Confederate general
John Liddell (architect) (1831–1922), Scottish architect
Johnny Liddell (footballer, born 1915) (1915–1986), Scottish footballer